Duarte may refer to:
 Duarte (surname), person's surname (or composed surname) and given name
 Duarte, California, United States
 Duarte Province, Dominican Republic
 Pico Duarte, mountain in the Dominican Republic

See also